Savage may refer to:

Places

Antarctica
 Savage Glacier, Ellsworth Land
 Savage Nunatak, Marie Byrd Land
 Savage Ridge, Victoria Land

United States

 Savage, Maryland, an unincorporated community
 Savage, Minnesota, a city
 Savage, Mississippi, an unincorporated community
 Savage, Montana, an unincorporated community
 Savage Lake, a lake in Minnesota
 Savage Mountain, an anticline extending from Pennsylvania into Maryland

Other places
 29837 Savage, an asteroid
 Savage Island (disambiguation)
 Savage River (disambiguation)

Arts and entertainment

Films
 The Savage (1917 film), an American drama
 The Savage (1926 film), an American silent film
 The Savage (1952 film), an American Western
 Savage (1973 TV film), directed by Steven Spielberg
 Savage! (1973 theatrical film), a blaxploitation film
 Savage (2009 film), a Canadian short film
 Savage (2010 film), by Brendan Muldowney

Music

Performers
 Savage (band), a British heavy metal band
 Savage (singer), Roberto Zanetti (born 1956), Italian musician

Albums
 Savage (Eurythmics album) or the title song, 1987
 Savage (video), a companion to the album, 1988
 Savage (Moxiie album) or the title song, 2012
 Savage (Tank album) or the title song, 2017
 Savage (Songs from a Broken World), by Gary Numan, 2017
 Savage, by Taichi Mukai, or the title song, 2019
 Savage, by Teengenerate, 1996
 Savage, by Trust, 1982

 Savage (EP), by Aespa, 2021

Songs
 "Savage" (Megan Thee Stallion song), by Megan Thee Stallion, 2020
 "Savage" (Aespa song), 2021
 "Savage", by Bahari, 2018
 "Savage", by A Boogie wit da Hoodie from Hoodie SZN, 2018
 "Savage", by Demon Hunter from Outlive, 2017
 "Savage", by Judas Priest from Stained Class, 1978
 "Savage", by Northlane from Mesmer, 2017
 "Savage", by Whethan, 2016
 "The Savage", by the Shadows, 1961

Video games
 Savage (video game), a 1988 action game by Firebird Software
 Savage: The Battle for Newerth, a 2003 computer game by S2 Games

Books 
 The Savage (Almond novel), a 2008 young adult graphic novel by David Almond
 Savage (Laymon novel), a 1993 novel by Richard Laymon

Fictional characters 
 Bill Savage, main character in the 2000 AD Invasion! stories,
 Savage/Noble, in the Transformers fictional universe
 Savage, in Darkspore
 Savage, in Savage Henry

Military
 , various Royal Navy ships
 , a destroyer escort launched in 1943
 North American AJ Savage, a US Navy carrier-based bomber
 RT-2, a Soviet intercontinental ballistic missile given the NATO reporting name SS-13 Savage
 Savage Division, a cavalry division of the Imperial Russian Army formed in 1914
 Camp Savage, Savage, Minnesota, the former site of a Military Intelligence Service language school during World War II

Structures
 Savage (MARC station), a passenger railway station between Washington, DC, and Baltimore
 Savage Arena, Toledo, Ohio
 Savage Dam, San Diego County, California
 Savage Stadium, on the campus of Oberlin College, Oberlin, Ohio

Vehicles
 HPI Savage, a radio-controlled vehicle
 Suzuki LS650 Savage, a motorcycle

People
 Savage (surname), a list of people with the surname
 Jimmy Savage or Savage (1910–1951), American journalist
 Savage (rapper) (born 1981), New Zealand-born rapper
 Roberto Zanetti or Savage (born 1956), Italian musician and producer
 Savage Steve Holland (born 1960), American animator and film director
 Savage Mostyn (c. 1713–1757), British Royal Navy vice-admiral, Comptroller of the Navy, a Lord of the Admiralty and Member of Parliament

Other uses
 S3 Savage, a series of graphics chipsets
 Savage Arms, a firearm manufacturer
 Savage Entertainment, a former video game developer
 Savage Club, a gentlemen's club in London
 Viscount Savage, an extinct title in the Peerage of England
 Savage, a sequel series to the comic series Invasion! (2000 AD)
 In heraldry, a figure of a "wild man"
 Barbarian, or savage, someone perceived to be uncivilized or primitive

See also
 Noble savage, a stock character and ethnic stereotype
 21 Savage or Shayaa Bin Abraham-Joseph (born 1992), American rapper
 
 Savaged (2013 film), a horror thriller
 Savages (disambiguation)
 Sgt. Savage and his Screaming Eagles, a line of military-themed toys produced by Hasbro in 1994